The 2010 Hartford Colonials season was the second season for the Hartford Colonials and the first since relocating to Hartford from New York City. The team finished with a 3–5 record and fourth in the league.

Offseason

UFL draft

Personnel

Staff

Roster

Schedule

Standings

Game summaries

Week 1: vs. Sacramento Mountain Lions

The first game in the second season of the UFL was a battle of the two teams that relocated during the offseason, the Sacramento Mountain Lions, formerly the California Redwoods, and the Hartford Colonials, formerly the New York Sentinels. Hartford took scored the first 27 points of the game en route to the franchise's first victory in its two-year history, 27–10. Hartford's QB Josh McCown completed 11 of 21 passes for 265 passes and three touchdowns. Daunte Culpepper of the Mountain Lions threw forty passes, completing twenty-one, threw for 174 yards with a touchdown and an interception. Sacramento lost on opening day for the second consecutive season. A record-crowd of 14,384 attended the first professional football game in Hartford since 1973.

Week 2: at Omaha Nighthawks

Week 4: vs. Florida Tuskers

Week 5: vs. Omaha Nighthawks

Week 6: at Las Vegas Locomotives

Week 7: at Sacramento Mountain Lions

Week 9: at Florida Tuskers

Week 10: vs. Las Vegas Locomotives

References

Hartford Colonials Season, 2010
Hartford Colonials seasons
Hartford Colonials